Stephen George Adeniran Domingo (born May 9, 1995) is a Nigerian-American basketball player who last played for the Fort Wayne Mad Ants of the NBA G League. He played college basketball for the Georgetown Hoyas and California Golden Bears.

Professional career

Donar (2017–2018)
On July 19, 2017, Domingo signed a 1-year contract with Donar of the Dutch Basketball League. On September 19, 2017, Domingo made his debut for Donar in the Champions League qualifying rounds. Domingo's performance on both ends of the court was recognized during Donar's FIBA Europe Cup campaign. In the FIBA Europe Cup, Domingo averaged 8.9 points per game and 3.8 rebounds per game in 21.9 minutes played, shooting 66.7% on field goals and 37.5% on three-point field goals. He scored in double figures in four of nine Europe Cup games played, including 13 points in a win against Keravnos in the second round of Europe Cup  and was instrumental in their second round win against Cluj.  Domingo suffered an MCL sprain in 2018 and returned to the US for rehab.

Lakeland Magic (2019–2021)
In 2019, Stephen Domingo joined the Lakeland Magic.

2021 NBA Summer League
In the 2021 NBA Summer League, Stephen Domingo played for the San Antonio Spurs.

Fort Wayne Mad Ants (2021–2022)
In 2021, Domingo joined the Fort Wayne Mad Ants. However, he was waived on February 22, after suffering a season-ending injury.

International career

United States
Domingo played with the United States U17 team at the 2012 FIBA Under-17 World Championship, where he won gold with the team.

Nigeria

In June 2019, Domingo was announced as part of preliminary roster for the  Nigerian team competing in the 2019 FIBA Basketball World Cup in China. On July 22, 2019, Domingo started for Nigeria in a friendly scrimmage against the FIBA World Cup-bound  national team, which Nigeria won. Domingo was the second leading scorer with 16 points on 54% shooting and 4/9 from 3 point range.

Domingo was named captain of Nigeria's national team at the F IBA AfroBasket 2021 in Kigali, Rwanda.

References

1995 births
Living people
American expatriate basketball people in the Netherlands
American men's basketball players
American sportspeople of Nigerian descent
Basketball players from San Francisco
California Golden Bears men's basketball players
Donar (basketball club) players
Dutch Basketball League players
Fort Wayne Mad Ants players
Georgetown Hoyas men's basketball players
Lakeland Magic players
Nigerian men's basketball players
Power forwards (basketball)
Small forwards